Binkley is a surname. Notable people with the surname include:

Gregg Binkley (born 1963), American actor
Howell Binkley, American lighting designer
John Binkley (born 1953), American politician
Leroy Binkley, American architect
Les Binkley (born 1934), Canadian ice hockey player
Pepper Binkley, American actress
Robert C. Binkley (1897–1940), American historian
Ross Binkley (1886––1915), Canadian football player
Thomas Binkley (1931–1995), American lutenist and musicologist
Timothy Binkley (born 1943), American philosopher
Binkley Brothers American old-time string band

Fictional characters:
Michael Binkley, character in the cartoon strip Bloom County